The XLVI Award of the Premio Ariel (2004) of the Academia Mexicana de Artes y Ciencias Cinematográficas took place on March 30, 2004 at the Palacio de Bellas Artes. The Premio Ariel for the best movie was awarded to El misterio del Trinidad.

List of winners and nominees

Best film

Winner
El misterio del Trinidad
Producers: García Agraz & Asociados, Instituto Mexicano de Cinematografía (Imcine) - Foprocine, Origen Producciones, Videocine and Resonancia Puerto Rico

Nominees
 Japón
Producers: Mantarraya Producciones, Nodream Cinema, Carlos Serrano and Imcine - Foprocine
 Mil nubes de paz cercan el cielo, amor, jamás acabarás de ser amor
Producers: Roberto Fiesco Trejo, Julián Hernández, Diego Arizmendi and the Imcine

Best director

Winner
José Luis García Agraz for El misterio del Trinidad

Nominees
 Carlos Reygadas for Japón
 Julián Hernández for Mil nubes de paz cercan el cielo, amor, jamás acabarás de ser amor

Best Iberoamerican film

Winner
Los lunes al sol of Fernando León de Aranoa (Spain)

Nominees
 Historias mínimas of Carlos Sorín (Argentina)
 El viaje hacia el mar of Guillermo Casanova (Uruguay)

First Work

Winner
Carlos Reygadas Castillo por Japón

Nominees
 Everardo González for La canción del pulque
 Julián Hernández for Mil nubes de paz cercan el cielo, amor, jamás acabarás de ser amor

Best cinematography

Winner
Guillermo Granillo por Volverás

Nominees
 Diego Martínez Vignatti for Japón
 Marcelo Iaccarino for Nicotina

Best actress

Winner
Rosa María Bianchi for Nicotina

Nominees
 Magdalena Flores for Japón
 Carmen Madrid for Nicotina

Best actor

Winner
Rafael Inclán for Nicotina

Nominees
 Eduardo Palomo for El misterio del Trinidad
 Alejandro Ferretis for Japón

Best supporting actress

Winner
Clarisa Rendón for Mil nubes de paz cercan el cielo, amor, jamás acabarás de ser amor

Nominees
 Regina Blandón for El misterio del Trinidad 
 Maite Embil for La tregua

Best supporting actor

Winner
Daniel Giménez Cacho for Nicotina

Nominees
 Guillermo Gil for El misterio del Trinidad
 Tristán Ulloa for Volverás

Best cast actress

Winner
Perla de la Rosa for Mil nubes de paz cercan el cielo, amor, jamás acabarás de ser amor

Nominees
 Lisa Owen for El misterio del Trinidad
 María de la Luz Cendejas por Seis días en la oscuridad

Best cast actor

Winner
Alejandro Parodi for El misterio del Trinidad

Nominees
 Jorge Zárate for Nicotina
 Silverio Palacios for Sin ton ni Sonia

Best documentary

Winner
La canción del pulque of Everardo González

Nominees
 La pasión de María Elena of Mercedes Moncada
 Recuerdos of Marcela Arteaga

Best short documentary

Winner
Lo que quedó de Pancho of Amir Galván Cervera

Nominees
 Los murmullos of Gabriel Hernández Tinajero
 XV en Zaachila of Rigoberto Pérezcano

Best short film

Winner
 Los no invitados of Ernesto Contreras, director

Nominees
 El otro sueño americano of Enrique Arroyo
 La Nao de China of Patricia Arriaga

Best animation short
The category was considered deserted

Best original script

Winners (tie)
Carlos Reygadas Castillo for Japón
Martín Salinas for Nicotina

Nominees
 José Luis García Agraz and Carlos Cuarón for El misterio del Trinidad
 Julián Hernández for Mil nubes de paz cercan el cielo, amor, jamás acabarás de ser amor

Best Adaptation

Winner
Antonio Chavarrías for Volverás

Nominees
Javier Valdés and Carlos Puig for Asesino en serio
Antonio Serrano for Lucía, Lucía

Best Original Score

Winners
Paul van Dyk for Zurdo

Nominees
 Mastretta for El misterio del Trinidad

Best sound

Winners (tie)
 Enrique L. Rendón, Aurora Ojeda, Ernesto Gaytán, Eliseo Fernández and Basilio García Reyes for Mil nubes de paz cercan el cielo, amor, jamás acabarás de ser amor
 Nerio Barberis, Lena Esquenazi and Ernesto Gaytán for Nicotina
 Gabriel Coll, Lena Esquenazi, Carlos Salces, Jaime Baksht and Ernesto Gaytán for Zurdo

Nominees
Antonio Diego, Samuel Larson y Olivier Dô Huú for Vera

Best art design
Eugenio Caballero, María Salinas, Canek Saemich Zenzes, Bárbara Enríquez and Óscar Hernández for Zurdo

Nominees
 Sandra Cabriada and Darío Ramos for Nicotina
 Theresa Wachter for Vera

Best make-up

Winner
Elisa Martínez for Vera

Nominees
 Mario Zarazúa for Nicotina
 Alfredo Mora and Mario Zarazúa for Zurdo

Best wardrobe

Winner
Bárbara González for Zurdo

Nominees
 Malena de la Riva for Asesino en serio
 Alejandra Dorantes for Nicotina
 Bárbara González for Vera

Best edition

Winner
Alberto de Toro for Nicotina

Nominees
 Jacobo Hernández and Emiliano Arenales for Mil nubes de paz cercan el cielo, amor, jamás acabarás de ser amor 
 Carlos Salces for Zurdo

Best special effects

Winner
 John Chadwick, Falk Büttner and Pedro González Sánchez for Vera

Nominees
 Jesús Pascual, Ramón Lorenzo, Manuel Carrión and Alejandro Vázquez for El misterio del Trinidad
 Daniel Cordero and Jaime Ramos por Zurdo

Awards per movie

 Nicotina (4)
Best Actress, Best Actor, Best Supporting Actor, Best Sound

 Mil nubes de paz cercan el cielo, amor, jamás acabarás de ser amor (3)
Best Supporting Actress, Best Cast Actress, Best Sound

Vera (3)
Best Original Score, Best Make-Up, Best Special Effects

Zurdo (3)
Best Original Score, Best Sound, Best Art Design

 El misterio de la trinidad (2)
Best Film, Best Cast Actor

 Japón (2)
Best Original Script, Best First Work

Volverás (2)
Best Adapted Script, Best Cinematography

External links
XLVI Ariel Awards (2004) 

Ariel Awards ceremonies
2004 film awards
Ariel